The Meriden Avenue–Oakland Road Historic District is a National Register of Historic Places district covering a residential section of Southington, Connecticut, located south of the center of town. At the time of the listing, in 1988, there were 113 buildings within the boundaries of the district, of which all but 22 are considered contributing. The period of significance for the district is 1860–1936. A residence built after 1936, or altered substantially qualifies as building as non-contributing. Only one building is deemed non-contributing due to extensive modelling.

Architectural styles
There are a variety of styles of architecture within the district. Styles represented:
 Italianate
 Queen Anne
 American Four Square
 Bungaloid
 Georgian
 Dutch Colonial
 Cape

An example of the Italianate style is the Mary Gridley Stevens House on 107 Meriden, built in 1870.

Some of the styles in the district are hybrids. The Byron & Ann Eliza Twiss House, located at 180–182 Meriden, is an example of a building with the influence of both Queen Anne and Stick architectural styles. The original owner, Byron Twiss, owned a wood turning factory, which may account for the "exceptional millwork".

The house at 173 Meriden is also a hybrid, with elements of Stick style, Queen Anne and Colonial Revival.

The two Beckley houses—the Moses W. Beckley House at 145 Meriden and the Charles W. Beckley House at 155 Meriden are both example of a combination of Queen Anne and Colonial revival styles.

There are several examples of the Italianate style in this area. The house at 133 Meriden Avenue is described as a  "larger cube-form version with a shallow-pitched hip roof".

The house at 104 Meriden, built in 1880, is an example of Vernacular Queen Anne.

The house at 119 Meriden, owned by J. Frank Pratt, is an example of American Four Square style architecture.

Gallery

See also
National Register of Historic Places listings in Southington, Connecticut

References

Houses on the National Register of Historic Places in Connecticut
Historic districts in Hartford County, Connecticut
Southington, Connecticut
National Register of Historic Places in Hartford County, Connecticut
Houses in Hartford County, Connecticut
Historic districts on the National Register of Historic Places in Connecticut